Brain Gender  is a book by Melissa Hines, Hines graduated with an undergraduate degree from Princeton, following through with a doctorate in psychology from UCLA.  Currently, Hines is a psychologist and neuroscientist at the University of Cambridge.

Brain Gender is a book exploring the biological differences between sex and gender. Hines questions whether different biological differences, such as hormones, affect the way people develop and act. Hines demonstrates the possibilities that genetic, biological, neuroendocrine, behavioral, social, and statistical aspects of born sex affect the differences between males or females in gender roles.

In the end of the book, it is concluded that the human tendency to perceive generalized gender differences is not supported by evidence.  Biology does not imply a deterministic set of gender creation or identification.

References 

Biology books
Gender studies literature
2005 non-fiction books